Euminucia orthogona is a species of moth of the family Noctuidae first described by George Hampson in 1913. It is found in Ghana and Gabon.

References

Catocalinae
Insects of West Africa
Owlet moths of Africa
Moths described in 1913